Baeturia or Bæturia may refer to:
 Baeturia (cicada), a genus of Australian cicadas
 Baeturia, Spain, also spelled Beturia, an Iron Age region in southern Spain

See also
 Beeturia, where beet pigments render urine red